The Wildspitz is the highest summit of the  Rossberg, a mountain of the Schwyzer Alps, located on the border between the Swiss cantons of Zug and Schwyz. Reaching a height of 1,580 metres above sea level, it is the highest summit in the canton of Zug.

The Wildspitz is surrounded by three lakes: Lake Zug, Lake Lauerz and Lake Ägeri.

References

External links

 Wildspitz on Hikr

Mountains of the Alps
Mountains of Switzerland
Highest points of Swiss cantons
Mountains of the canton of Zug
One-thousanders of Switzerland